Elena Eduardovna Grushina ( or  Olena Eduardivna Hrushyna; born 8 January 1975) is a Ukrainian ice dancer. With partner and then-husband Ruslan Goncharov, she is the 2006 Olympic bronze medalist, 2005 World bronze medalist, and two-time (2005, 2006) European silver medalist.

Career 
Grushina began skating at four and switched from single skating to ice dancing when she was 12. Grushina first competed with Mikhail Tashlitsky but the partnership ended when he decided to focus on school. 

Having trained in the same group in Odessa, Grushina and Ruslan Goncharov were paired together in 1989. They finished fourth at the 1992 Junior Worlds. They were 18th in their senior Worlds debut at the 1994 World Championships. In early 1997, Grushina and Goncharov began training with coaches Natalia Linichuk and Gennadi Karponosov in Newark, Delaware. They finished 15th at their first Olympics in 1998. They won their first Grand Prix medal, silver, at 1999 Skate Canada International. 

Grushina and Goncharov were 9th at the 2002 Olympics and 6th at the 2002 World Championships. In the summer of 2002, they changed coaches to Tatiana Tarasova and Nikolai Morozov in Newington, Connecticut. During the 2002–03 season, they won three gold medals on the Grand Prix series, at 2002 Skate America, 2002 Skate Canada International, and 2002 Trophée Lalique. They qualified for the Grand Prix Final where they finished fourth. They were also fourth at the 2003 European Championships and fifth at the 2003 World Championships. 

During the 2003–04 season, Grushina and Goncharov won three silver medals on the Grand Prix series, at 2003 Skate America, 2003 Cup of China, and 2003 NHK Trophy. They qualified for the Grand Prix Final where they again finished fourth, but a couple months later they won their first European medal, bronze, at the 2004 European Championships. They were fourth at the 2004 World Championships.

During the 2004–05 season, Grushina and Goncharov competed at one Grand Prix event, 2004 Cup of Russia, where they won the silver medal. Since they only competed at one event, they did not earn enough points to qualify for the Grand Prix Final. They won their second European medal, silver, at the 2005 European Championships. They capped off their season by winning their first World medal, bronze, at the 2005 World Championships.

During the 2005–06 season, Grushina and Goncharov competed at two Grand Prix events. They won silver at 2005 Skate Canada International and gold at 2005 Trophée Eric Bompard. They qualified for their third Grand Prix Final and came away with their first medal at the event, silver. They won their third European medal, silver, at the 2006 European Championships. At the 2006 Olympics, they were fifth in the compulsory dance but placed third in the original and free dances to capture their first Olympic medal. They retired after the Olympics.

Personal life 
Grushina and Goncharov married in 1995, but are now divorced. Grushina took part in Russian Dancing On Ice show where she met Mikhail Zelensky, a TV presenter. Their daughter, Sofia, was born in 2008.

Programs 
(with Ruslan Goncharov)

Results 
(with Goncharov for Ukraine)

(with Goncharov for the Soviet Union)

References

External links 

 Official site
 
 Elena Grushina / Ruslan Goncharov at Tracings
 Care to Ice Dance? – Grushina & Goncharov

1975 births
Ukrainian female ice dancers
Figure skaters at the 1998 Winter Olympics
Figure skaters at the 2002 Winter Olympics
Figure skaters at the 2006 Winter Olympics
Living people
Olympic bronze medalists for Ukraine
Olympic figure skaters of Ukraine
Sportspeople from Odesa
Olympic medalists in figure skating
World Figure Skating Championships medalists
European Figure Skating Championships medalists
Medalists at the 2006 Winter Olympics
Universiade medalists in figure skating
Goodwill Games medalists in figure skating
Universiade gold medalists for Ukraine
Competitors at the 2001 Winter Universiade
Competitors at the 1994 Goodwill Games
Competitors at the 1998 Goodwill Games
21st-century Ukrainian women
20th-century Ukrainian women